Clarence Charles "Ducky" Nash (December 7, 1904 – February 20, 1985) was an American voice actor. He is best remembered as the original voice of the Disney cartoon character Donald Duck. He was born in the rural community of Watonga, Oklahoma, and a street in that town is named in his honor. In 1993, he was posthumously made a Disney Legend for his contributions to Walt Disney films.

Career
Nash made a name for himself in the late 1920s as an impressionist for KHJ, a Los Angeles radio station, on their show, The Merrymakers. He later was employed by the Adohr Milk Company for publicity purposes. Dubbed "Whistling Clarence, the Adohr Bird Man", Nash rode the streets with a team of miniature horses and gave treats to the children. In 1932, Nash happened by the Disney Studio with his team of horses, and decided to leave a copy of his Adohr publicity sheet with the receptionist. As it turns out, his name was recognized from a reprise appearance on The Merrymakers a few days previous, and Walt Disney himself had been impressed by Nash's vocal skills. He was asked to make an informal audition.

Donald Duck
One source indicates Nash auditioned before a casting director for Walt Disney Studios and did a voice impression of a billy goat that Nash had started doing as a child in Watonga. The director then reached for the intercom and told Walt Disney, "I think we have found our duck." Another version indicates Nash went through several of his voices, and Walt Disney happened by when Nash gave his impersonation of a family of ducks. Disney declared Nash perfect for the role of a talking duck in their upcoming animated short, The Wise Little Hen. The duck was Donald Duck, who Nash went on to voice for 51 years, in over 120 shorts and films. The last film to feature Nash's famous voice was 1983's Mickey's Christmas Carol, although he continued to provide Donald's voice for commercials, promos, and other miscellaneous material until his death.

As early as 1938, promoters from lecture circuits were approaching him on his unique voice of Donald. Disney reportedly didn't like the engagements at first, feeling that a human doing the voice would be spoiling the illusion, but then long after he had second thoughts. In early 1941, Nash was traveling on personal appearance tours sponsored by Disney. During World War II, Nash, with his ventriloquist puppet of Donald, which was built by Disney's character modeling department, became a regular performer at USO bond rallies and other events to support the war effort. In the mid-1940s, Roy and Walt approved the Donald puppet and they decided to harness it for the 1944 re-release  of Snow White and the Seven Dwarfs. RKO and Disney were unsure how the film would do the second time around at the box office after its initial blockbuster run, so they did a promotional campaign with Disney characters including Nash performing with the Donald puppet. During the promotional period of Fun and Fancy Free, he did multiple radio appearances from May to September 1947, with one of those appearances starring Disney himself. He voiced Donald for 1950s TV commercials.

Nash's Donald Duck voice was achieved by what is called buccal speech: an alaryngeal form of vocalization which uses the inner cheek to produce sound rather than the larynx. He first discovered it while trying to mimic his pet goat Mary. In his days before Disney, Nash performed in vaudeville shows where he often spoke in a "nervous baby goat" voice.

Donald Duck became one of the world's most famous cartoon characters, in great part due to Nash's voice. The voice is distinctive both for its ducklike quality and the fact that it is often very difficult for anybody to understand, especially when Donald flew into a rage (which happened fairly often). To keep Donald's voice consistent throughout the world, Nash voiced the character in all foreign languages the Disney shorts were translated to (with the aid of the phonetic alphabet), meaning Donald retained his same level of incoherency all across the globe.

Other characters
In addition to Donald's voice, Clarence Nash also voiced Donald's nephews Huey, Dewey and Louie and his girlfriend Daisy. He provided the meows and yowls of Figaro the kitten in Pinocchio and in a handful of shorts; in Pinocchio he also provided the Popeye-esque voice for the Rough House statue. He also voiced a bullfrog croaking "Watch out!" in Bambi and also did some dog sounds in One Hundred and One Dalmatians, and also voiced Jiminy Cricket for a brief period of time after Cliff Edwards's death in 1971. 

Nash's iconic Donald Duck voice would be impersonated elsewhere in animation, most notably in the Tom and Jerry cartoons directed by William Hanna and Joseph Barbera with the characters Little Quacker (voiced by Red Coffey) and Yakky Doodle (voiced by Jimmy Weldon). As with most Hanna-Barbera productions, these characters used celebrity impersonations, in these cases an impersonation of Clarence Nash's Donald Duck voice. Because both were so similar to Nash's voice they were often mistakenly attributed to Nash. Likewise, contrary to popular belief, he did not perform the duck voice for Rick Dees' "Disco Duck"; it was one of Dees' acquaintances. Nash would also use his duck voice on The Burns & Allen Show during the 1940s, playing Gracie's pet duck.

Nash appeared as himself in the 1941 film The Reluctant Dragon, which shows how Disney films are produced, and was a contestant on a 1954 episode of What's My Line and a 1964 episode of To Tell the Truth. Nash also appeared as himself in a 1956 episode of Disneyland entitled "A Day in the Life of Donald Duck", in which he interacts with an animated Donald who blames him for his speech problems: the two end up arguing mainly due to Donald's short temper. He was also a guest on a 1976 episode of The Mike Douglas Show. The 1984 special Donald Duck's 50th Birthday included several clips from Disney films and Disneyland episodes.

Later years
When Disney shut down their shorts department in 1962, Nash continued to voice Donald in various projects over the next two decades.

In the late 1970s, Nash was known for often taking walks in the neighborhood around Fremont Elementary School in Glendale, California, entertaining children with his Donald Duck voice. As he passed the age of 70, he found the harsh voice increasingly straining on his throat and so limited public performances to groups of children. During recording sessions, he would take frequent breaks and drink plenty of water to avoid overexerting himself.

One of Nash's final performances was in Mickey's Christmas Carol (1983), which made Donald the only character in the film to be voiced by his original actor. His career at Disney was the subject of the premiere episode of Disney Family Album, a 1984 series of documentaries about behind-the-scenes personalities at the studio.

Personal life
Nash married Margaret Seamans in 1930; they had two children, Kay and Peggy.

Death

Nash died on February 20, 1985, of leukemia in the Providence Saint Joseph Medical Center in Burbank, California, at the age of 80 and was interred in the San Fernando Mission Cemetery in Mission Hills, Los Angeles, California. The tombstone of the grave he now shares with his wife Margaret Nash depicts a carving of Donald and Daisy Duck holding hands.

Successor and upcoming biography
After Nash's death, Donald's voice has been taken up by Disney animator Tony Anselmo, who was trained under Nash personally. Anselmo is also among the many voiceover artists to have voiced Huey, Dewey and Louie over the years. Later characters whose voices owe considerable credit to Nash's duck voice have been voiced by actors such as Jimmy Weldon, Frank Welker, Luba Goy and Red Coffey. The most prominent of these is Weldon's Yakky Doodle for Hanna-Barbera.

Disney historian J.B. Kaufman is currently working with Margaret Barnes, Nash's granddaughter, on a biography of Nash.

Filmography

Radio

Shorts

Film

Television

Discography
 Mickey and the Beanstalk (Capitol, 1947) as Donald Duck
 Donald Duck's Singing Lesson/Pluto, The Pup (Golden, 1949) as Donald Duck
 Cinderella (RCA, 1949) as Lucifer, Bruno, Major, Additional Animal Voices
 Mickey's New Car/Donald Duck at the Opera (Golden, 1950) as Donald Duck
 Donald Duck, Babysitter/Mickey Mouse and Farmer Rush Rush (Golden, 1950) as Donald Duck
 Donald Duck Cowboy (Golden, 1950) as Donald Duck
 Trick or Treat (RCA Victor, 1952) as Donald Duck
 Mr. Television (RCA Victor, 1952) as Donald Duck
 Mr. Animated Cartoon (RCA Victor, 1952) as Donald Duck
 Donald Duck, Fire Chief (Golden, 1953) as Donald Duck
 Mickey Mouse's Birthday Party (Capitol, 1954) as Donald Duck
 School Days (Golden, 1954) as Donald Duck
 Mickey Mouse's Christmas Party (Golden, 1954) as Donald Duck
Happy Birthday to Mickey Mouse/Donald Duck's Unbirthday (Golden, 1955) as Donald Duck
 Walt Disney's Song Parade from Disneyland (Golden, 1956) as Donald Duck
 Goofy's Dance Party (Disneyland, 1959) as Donald Duck
 Donald Duck and His Friends (Disneyland, 1960) as Donald Duck
 Chipmunk Fun (Disneyland, 1963) as Donald Duck
 Mickey and the Beanstalk (Disneyland, 1963) as Donald Duck
 Dickens' Christmas Carol Presented by the Walt Disney Players (Disneyland, 1975) as Donald Duck
 Yankee Doodle Mickey (Disneyland, 1980) as Donald Duck
 Goin' Quackers (Disneyland, 1980) as Donald Duck
 Pardners (Disneyland, 1980) as Donald Duck
 Merry Christmas Carols (Disneyland, 1980) as Donald Duck
 Mousercise (Disneyland, 1982) as Donald Duck
 Mickey Mouse Splashdance (Disneyland, 1983) as Donald Duck

See also
 Donald Duck talk

References

External links

 

1904 births
1985 deaths
20th-century American male actors
American male voice actors
Animal impersonators
Burials at San Fernando Mission Cemetery
Deaths from cancer in California
Deaths from leukemia
Disney people
Inkpot Award winners
Male actors from Oklahoma
People from Watonga, Oklahoma